Elk River High School (variously as Elk River Senior High School) is a public high school located in Elk River, Minnesota, United States. It is the one of four high schools in the Elk River Area School District (ISD 728) and its feeder schools are VandenBerge Middle School and Salk Middle School. In the 201112 school year, Elk River had an enrollment of 1,649 students. Elk River's colors are red and white. The National Center of Education Statistics classifies the high school as a large, suburban campus. The Elk River Elks compete in the Northwest Suburban Conference of the Minnesota State High School League as well as in Section 7AAAAA (5A) for football. Elk River High School opened in 1888.

Demographics 

During the 201112 school year, Elk River High School was 90% White, 6% Hispanic, 0% Hawaii Native/Pacific Islander, 6% Black, 7% Asian, and 1% Native American. 14% of students were eligible for the Free Lunch Program and 6% were eligible for the Reduced-Price Lunch Program.

Athletics

Football
Elk River played in one of the earliest recorded football games in state history (1891-1892 - defeated Monticello 29-0 & 4-0) and there are records of them completing 131 seasons of varsity football through the 2022 season.

They have that have played in the District 16, Rum River, Skyline, Independent, Central Lakes, North Suburban, Twin Cities Suburban, Northwest Suburban, Mississippi 8, and North Central District (Blue & Black Sub-district) conferences.

The team was the 5A state champion in 2016  and 2022.

Ice hockey
The boys' hockey team won the state championship in 2001. Both the boys' and girls' hockey teams play home games on an Olympic-sized ice sheet in Furniture and Things Community Event Center, which is located next to the high school.

Notable alumni
 Gerhard Pfanzelter (class of  1962) (exchange student)  Austrian ambassador to the United States
 Joel Otto (class of 1980)  NHL forward and 1989 Stanley Cup champion with the Calgary Flames
 Paul Martin (class of 2000)  NHL defenseman
 Dan Hinote (class of 1995)  NHL winger and coach
 Nate Prosser (class of 2004)  NHL defenseman
 Dave Mordal  comedian
 Emma Bates (Class of 2010)  Distance Runner

Media Coverage
In 2010, four athletes were removed from the highschool's varsity football team under allegations of hazing using broomsticks.

References

Public high schools in Minnesota
Schools in Sherburne County, Minnesota
1888 establishments in Minnesota
Educational institutions established in 1888